or okkot is an idiom typical to people coming from South Sulawesi, especially from ethnic Makassar and Bugis. It is characterized by unintentionally changing some part of a word in Indonesian during a conversation.

Etymology
Okkot(s) is derived from the word okko' in Makassar language which literally means "trespassing a dividing line". This term was first introduced in traditional games played by children in South Sulawesi.

Characteristics
There are various forms of okkots, some of the most generally occurred are removing the letter "g" in a word that ended with "g" and adding "g" in a word that ended with "n".

Examples:

See also
 Indonesian slang

References

Counterculture